Rudolph William Michael Feilding, 11th Earl of Denbigh, 10th Earl of Desmond (2 August 1943 – 23 March 1995), known as Rollo Feilding and Rollo Denbigh, was a British peer, advertising executive, Rolls-Royce dealer and racing driver. 

He was the eldest son of William Feilding, 10th Earl of Denbigh and Verena Barbara (née Price).

Marriage 
He married Caroline Judith Vivienne Cooke on 2 September 1965. They had three children: Lady Samantha, Lady Louisa, and Alexander, the current 12th Earl of Denbigh and 11th Earl of Desmond.

References

1943 births
1995 deaths
Earls of Denbigh
Desmond, William Feilding, 10th Earl of
20th-century English nobility